Old St. Joseph's Catholic Church, now Old St. Joe's Hall, is a historic former church building at Anvil City Square in Nome, Alaska.

Designed by J.B. Randell of Seattle, Washington and built in 1901, it is one of the oldest buildings in the city.  It is also the only wood-frame Gothic Revival church in Alaska, and is one of the most visible buildings in the city.  Originally located at the corner of West King Place and Steadman Street, it served as a church until 1944.  It fell into disrepair, resulting in the removal of its distinctive tall steeple.  In 1995, it was given to the city, which moved it to Anvil City Square the following year and restored it.  It now serves as a community hall.

The building is listed on the National Register of Historic Places since 2000.

See also
National Register of Historic Places listings in Nome Census Area, Alaska

References

1901 establishments in Alaska
Roman Catholic churches completed in 1901
Churches on the National Register of Historic Places in Alaska
Community centers in the United States
Gothic Revival church buildings in Alaska
Buildings and structures on the National Register of Historic Places in Nome Census Area, Alaska
Nome, Alaska
Relocated buildings and structures in Alaska
Roman Catholic churches in Alaska
Roman Catholic Diocese of Fairbanks
Former churches in Alaska
20th-century Roman Catholic church buildings in the United States